is a series of tactical role-playing game software and spinoff of the long-running RPG Maker series, although the name is not a direct translation of the original name which would be "Simulation RPG Maker".

Releases
There have been two versions of Sim RPG Maker. A Windows version was released on May 29, 1998, in Japan only.
Shortly after the first release, there was a console version released on September 17, 1998 for the Sega Saturn and Sony PlayStation in Japan only by ASCII.

Gameplay
Simulation RPG Maker 95 was released a year after RPG Maker 95 and allowed the user to create tactical games similar to the Fire Emblem series. While Sim RPG Maker 95 retained the user friendly layout and design of RPG Maker 95 it required a basic understanding of the program to properly use.

This style of game is classified as a tactical RPG similar to Final Fantasy Tactics, Fire Emblem, and Ogre Battle.

The program is somewhat limited and inflexible in comparison to other RPG Makers. It comes with a run-time package (RTP) with built-in graphics for animations. Custom graphics can be added, but this is more difficult than in other programs from the RPG Maker series. Graphics are limited to 256 colors, which can cause distortion if two graphics with differing pallets are used on the same map. Files must follow a strict naming convention using letters to designate the type of file, followed by numbers to differentiate the file. For example, a walking graphic for a character class using picture ID 007, could be named CA03_007. The first two letters, "CA", correspond to "character animation". The first set of numerical digits correspond to the animation slot used in the animation editor, slot 03. The final set of numerical digits correspond to the picture ID being used, 007.
One advantage Sim RPG Maker has over others in the series is that it does not require the installation of the RTP to run a game created by the program. Only the installation of the game is necessary. However, the graphics can only come in BMP file format, creating larger file sizes than the other RPG Maker programs.

A game typically involves several maps, each with a starting event or cutscene, the main battle, and an ending cutscene. In between maps, players can be sent to the camp, where they may purchase items, switch out party members, change equipment, or check stats of characters. Maps can be designed with different objectives in mind.  The most common objective is defeating all enemies or a specific boss character. In addition, players may have to survive a set number of rounds, move past a specified location, or prevent specified characters from dying. Some maps may even be used strictly for cutscenes, with no battles taking place. Maps are progressed through linearly, but it is possible to send the player to maps out of order, enabling multiple/alternate storyline forks. It is also possible to send the player to a previous map.

References

External links
Sim RPG Maker 95 - Official Japanese page for Sim RPG Maker 95

Kadokawa Dwango franchises
RPG Maker
Video game IDE